USS John Warner (SSN-785) is a nuclear powered  attack submarine of the United States Navy. She is the first in the class to be named after a person; the first 11 Virginia-class subs were named after states. John Warner was originally to be built by the Electric Boat division of General Dynamics in Groton, Connecticut, but the contract was later transferred to Huntington Ingalls Industries Newport News Shipbuilding. She is the second of the Block III subs, which have a revised bow and some technology from  cruise missile submarines. The vessel supports 40 weapons, special operations forces, unmanned undersea vehicles, and the Advanced SEAL Delivery System (ASDS).

The name was announced on 8 January 2009, five days after John Warner, a Republican from Virginia, retired after serving 30 years as a United States senator, making John Warner the 13th U.S. Navy vessel to be named for a living person in the last hundred years.

Construction began on 29 April 2009 with the keel laying ceremony being held on 16 March 2013. Because of the modular construction sequence, the submarine was reportedly already about 59% complete before the official keel laying. The submarine was christened on 6 September 2014. John Warner was commissioned on 1 August 2015 with Commander Dan Caldwell in command.

On 14 April 2018, while on her first deployment, USS John Warner took part in targeted strikes against Syrian military facilities. She fired six Tomahawk cruise missiles, in what was believed to be the first combat use of her class of submarines.

References

 

Virginia-class submarines
Nuclear submarines of the United States Navy
Ships built in Newport News, Virginia
2014 ships